Nora Valsami (born 24 January 1948) is a Greek film and theatre actress.

Life and career
Nora Valsami was born in Cairo, Egypt. Her first stage appearance was in a 1965 production of Aristophanes' tragedy Ecclesiazusae while still a student at the Athens Drama School. Her film acting debut was in Tzeni Tzeni, a 1966 film. Even though she played a minor role in the film she was awarded a contract by Finos Film. In 1975 she retired from films to concentrate on her theatrical career. In the theatre she played the role of the bride in Blood Wedding and also appeared in An Ideal Husband, Barefoot in the Park and other plays. She has also played several roles on TV. She is married to Errikos Andreou, a television film director.

References

External links

1945 births
Living people
Greek film actresses
Greek stage actresses
Actresses from Cairo